Brecht Dejaegere (born 29 May 1991) is a Belgian professional footballer who plays as an midfielder for  club Toulouse, whom he also captains.

Honours
Kortrijk

 Belgian Cup runner-up: 2011–12

Gent
Belgian Pro League: 2014–15
Belgian Cup runner-up: 2018–19
Belgian Super Cup: 2015
Toulouse

 Ligue 2: 2021–22

References

External links
 Profile at KAA Gent
 
 

1991 births
Living people
Belgian footballers
Association football midfielders
K.V. Kortrijk players
K.A.A. Gent players
Toulouse FC players
Belgian Pro League players
Ligue 1 players
Ligue 2 players
Belgian expatriate footballers
Expatriate footballers in France